Rena Pagrati  (13 March 1949 – 25 June 1998) was a Greek cinema, TV and theatre actress. On 25 June 1998 she committed suicide.

Rena Pagrati was also a singer in the Greek musical band "Nostradamos".

References

External links

Greek film actresses
Greek stage actresses
Greek television actresses
1949 births
1998 deaths
20th-century Greek actresses
1998 suicides
Drug-related suicides
Suicides in Greece
Actresses from Athens